Martin Benrath (9 November 1926 – 31 January 2000) was a German film actor. He appeared in more than 60 films between 1954 and 2000.

Partial filmography

  (1954), as Michael Godeysen
 The Angel with the Flaming Sword (1954), as Jürgen Marein
 A Thousand Melodies (1956), as Martin Hoff
 Melody of the Heath (1956), as Ulrich Haagen
 Court Martial (1959), as Funk-Offizier Maiers
 The Ideal Woman (1959), as Axel Jungk
 Morituri (1965), as Kruse
 Eintausend Milliarden (1974)
  (1975), as Lukas Berlinger
 When Hitler Stole Pink Rabbit (1978, TV film), as Papa
 The Buddenbrooks (1979, TV miniseries), as Johann Jr.
 Put on Ice (1980), as V-Mann Körner
 From the Life of the Marionettes (1980), as Professor Mogens Jensen
 Die Weiße Rose (1982), as Prof. Kurt Huber
 Väter und Söhne – Eine deutsche Tragödie (1986, TV miniseries), as Bankier Bernheim
 Success (1991), as Dr. Otto Klenk
 Death Came As a Friend (1991, TV film), as Gerhard Selb
 Schtonk! (1992), as Uwe Esser
 Stalingrad (1993), as General Hentz
  (1993), as Herr Theilhaber
  (1996), as Thomas Mann
 Widows (1998), as Charles Bernsdorf
 Campus (1998), as Von Zittkau
 Alle für die Mafia (1998)
  (1998, TV miniseries), as Grandfather
 Beresina, or the Last Days of Switzerland (1999), as Alt-Divisionär Sturzenegger
  (1999, TV film), as Gustav

References

External links

1926 births
2000 deaths
German male film actors
German male television actors
Deaths from cancer in Germany
Male actors from Berlin
Officers Crosses of the Order of Merit of the Federal Republic of Germany
Members of the Academy of Arts, Berlin
20th-century German male actors